This is a list of reflected sources of light examples in contrast to the List of light sources. The list is oriented towards visible light reflection.

Celestial and atmospheric light

See also
Reflection (physics)
Diffuse reflection

Scattering, absorption and radiative transfer (optics)
Light